Dorothy Kisaka (born 1964), is a Ugandan lawyer and corporate executive who was appointed as the executive director of Kampala Capital City Authority, on 12 June 2020. She replaces Jennifer Musisi, the founding executive director of KCCA, who resigned on 15 December 2018, and Engineer Andrew Mubiru Kitaka, who was the acting Executive Director from December 2018 until June 2020.

Early life and education
Kisaka was born in Uganda in 1964. After attending local primary and secondary schools, she was admitted to Makerere University, in Kampala, the capital city of Uganda, where she graduated with a Bachelor of Laws degree in 1987. She followed that by obtaining a Diploma in Legal Practice from the Law Development Centre, also in Kampala. She was then admitted to the Uganda Bar.

Her second degree is a Master of Arts in Organisational Leadership and Management (MAOL), obtained from Uganda Christian University, in Mukono, Uganda. Her third degree is also a Master of Arts degree in Leading Innovation and Change (MALIC), awarded by York St John University, in the United Kingdom.

Career
Immediately prior to her current appointment, she was a Senior Presidential Advisor deployed as Deputy Head of the Prime Minister's Delivery Unit in the Office of the Prime Minister. From 1999 until 2014, she was an Associate Attorney at Kiyimba—Kisaka & Company Advocates, based in Kampala.

In April 2020, Yoweri Museveni, the President of Uganda, appointed Dorothy Kisaka as secretary of the COVID-19 Response Fund. Following interviews with the Uganda Ministry of Public Service, she assumed office as the second substantive executive director of KCCA. She was sworn in as the Executive Director of KCCA on 31 July 2020.

Other considerations
Kisaka served as the executive director at Destiny Consult, from March 2001 until December 2014. Destiny Consult is a leadership school, which Dorothy Kisaka co-founded in 2001.

From October 2010 until December 2014, Kisaka also served as a commissioner at the Electoral Commission of Uganda. She was then appointed as a presidential advisor and subsequently a Senior Presidential Advisor. She currently serves as the chairperson of Development Associates International and represents Africa on the Board of Haggai International.

References

External links
Website of Kampala Capital City Authority

1964 births
Living people
20th-century Ugandan businesswomen
20th-century Ugandan businesspeople
21st-century Ugandan businesswomen
21st-century Ugandan businesspeople
Makerere University alumni
Law Development Centre alumni
Uganda Christian University alumni
Alumni of York St John University
Ugandan women chief executives
21st-century Ugandan women politicians
21st-century Ugandan politicians
Ugandan women business executives